The Desiya Murpokku Dravida Kazhagam (DMDK) is an Indian regional political party in the state of Tamil Nadu. It is a Dravidian party founded by the former leader of the opposition in the Tamil Nadu Legislative Assembly Vijayakant (Captain) at Madurai on 14 September 2005. The DMDK is led by its founder as president and general secretary of the party. The headquarters of the party is located at Jawaharlal Nehru Salai, Koyambedu, Chennai.

Policies
 "Save Mother Tamil and Learn All Languages" is the policy statement of the Desiya Murpokku Dravida Kazhagam.
 Our aim is to strive to create a state where there are no people below the poverty line by maintaining purity, currency, and humanity in politics.
 First, stop the bribery and corruption that is stopping the progress and development of Tamil Nadu and the bitterness, dishonesty, and selfishness that have spread in politics and eradicate them in the future.
 To create a state where all our religions agree by completely eradicating those who instigate terrorism, those who support terrorism, and all terrorism from the country.
 To resolve river water issues with neighbouring states such as Andhra Pradesh, Karnataka, Kerala, and Puducherry and develop friendly relations, laying the groundwork for connecting rivers with the goal of using water wasted in the respective states to Tamil Nadu.
 In order to improve the quality of education in Tamil Nadu without changing its ancient history and culture, practical education should be in line with modern times and practices, emphasising vocational education, providing quality education to Tamil Nadu, and transforming students' futures.
 Making Tamil Nadu India's first employment-generating state.
 Establishing mechanisms for fair pricing of agricultural produce to protect the interests of farmers
 To modernise the weaving industry, protect the dying industry, and devise new schemes to protect the welfare of the weavers and strive for the development of the weaving industry.
 We strive to treat women with the same dignity and respect as men. We will make Tamil Nadu bright by taking love, virtue, and power as our ambitious motto.

History

Vijayakant era (14 September 2005 – Present)

The party was founded on 14 September 2005, as Desiya Murpokku Dravida Kazhagam (DMDK) by Vijayakant (Captain), a veteran Tamil film star and popular politician. He assumed the responsibility of the founder-president of the party. Ramu Vasanthan, who was the state president of the fans' forum, took charge as the general secretary of the party. On 17 July 2009, he died of a cardiac arrest. In 2014, the party's founder-president, Vijayakant, took over the position that had previously been vacant.

In the 2006 assembly elections, the party contested all 234 seats without an alliance and bagged only one seat with 8.38% of the vote, that of its founder-president Vijayakant from Virudhachalam constituency, who served as a member of the Tamil Nadu Legislative Assembly. Other candidates of this party who contested in other constituencies in this election failed.

In the 2009 general elections, it contested 40 seats—39 in Tamil Nadu and 1 in Puducherry—without an alliance and lost in all the constituencies with 0.75% of the vote.

Following widespread corruption, a price rise, a power cut, and allegations of nepotism against the Dravida Munnetra Kazhagam government, in the 2011 assembly elections, the party, in alliance with parties like the left and former chief minister of Tamil Nadu J. Jayalalithaa's All India Anna Dravida Munnetra Kazhagam (AIADMK), swept the polls, winning 202 seats, with the DMDK winning 29 out of 40 which it contested, and got the opposition status in the Tamil Nadu Legislative Assembly by making it a second largest party in the legislative assembly next only to its ally AIADMK pushing DMK to third position and Vijayakant recognized as the leader of the opposition in the assembly, becoming the first actor to become the leader of the opposition in a state's legislative assembly in India. The large victory also earned recognition and a permanent election symbol from the Election Commission of India. Vijayakant stepped down as leader of the opposition on 21 February 2016, after eight DMDK party MLAs resigned.

The party's performance began to deteriorate after the 2014 general elections; it fought the Lok Sabha election in an alliance with the Bharatiya Janata Party-led National Democratic Alliance (NDA). Marumalarchi Dravida Munnetra Kazhagam, Pattali Makkal Katchi, and Kongunadu Makkal Desiya Katchi and Indhiya Jananayaga Katchi's Social Democratic Alliance are the other allies of the National Democratic Alliance in Tamil Nadu. In the NDA alliance, this party has the highest number of seats, which are 14 in number. Despite the big hype, the party lost all 14 seats to AIADMK candidates. But this is the first time in 52 years that the DMK alliance was pushed to third place by the number of seats, and this election has given confidence to most parties that the future of Tamil Nadu lies in a coalition government.

The DMDK decided to run alongside the People's Welfare Front (PWA) in the 2016 Tamil Nadu Legislative Assembly elections, as part of the "Captain Vijayakant Alliance," which included the Communist Party of India (Marxist), Communist Party of India, Vaiko's Marumalarchi Dravida Munnetra Kazhagam, and Thol. Thirumavalavan's Viduthalai Chiruthaigal Katchi. The DMDK performed poorly in the election, not winning even a single constituency and losing deposits in the majority of its seats. It also witnessed a vote swing of -5.49% from the 2011 assembly elections.

In the 2019 general elections, after several rounds of talks with different political parties, The move comes after the DMDK’s attempts to make an alliance with the Dravida Munnetra Kazhagam, which has already entered into a pre-poll alliance with the Congress and several others, failed. DMDK contested with the Bharatiya Janata Party-led National Democratic Alliance (NDA) in Tamil Nadu for the 17th Lok Sabha polls, along with All India Anna Dravida Munnetra Kazhagam, Pattali Makkal Katchi, Tamil Maanila Congress (Moopanar), and some unrecognized parties. Vijayakant wants to prove his vote bank strength in this election, but the party was humiliated and lost all four that it contested out of the 39 Lok Sabha seats in the state. The Secular Progressive Alliance (SPA), a DMK-led alliance consisting of all the major opposition parties in the state, swept the election by winning 38 seats.

In the 2021 assembly elections, the DMDK, which had the support of the Amma Makkal Munnettra Kazagam, Social Democratic Party of India, and All India Majlis-e-Ittehadul Muslimeen, lost 60 seats contested and saw a vote percentage swing of -1.96% compared to previous assembly elections. After the election, the DMK emerged as the ruling party, and the AIADMK emerged as the main party of the opposition in the assembly.

Electoral performance

Indian general elections

State legislative assembly elections

Current office bearers and prominent members

List of party leaders

Presidents

General Secretaries

Legislative leaders

List of leaders of the opposition

Leaders of the Opposition in the Tamil Nadu Legislative Assembly

List of deputy leaders of the opposition

Deputy leaders of the Opposition in the Tamil Nadu Legislative Assembly

References

External links
 Vijaykanth's interview to rediff.com
 தேமுதிக Official Facebook Link

Desiya Murpokku Dravida Kazhagam
Dravidian political parties
Political parties in Tamil Nadu
Political parties established in 2005
2005 establishments in Tamil Nadu
Political parties in India